The Xinfang Bridge is a historic stone arch bridge over the Shi River in Tianning District of Changzhou, Jiangsu, China.

History
The original bridge dates back to 535, during the Liang dynasty (502–557), and underwent three renovations, respectively in the Huangqing period of the Yuan dynasty (1271–1368), in the 11th year of the Hongzhi period of the Ming dynasty (1368–1644), and in 1986. In December 2011, it has been authorized as a provincial-level cultural heritage site by the Government of Jiangsu.

References

Bridges in Jiangsu
Arch bridges in China
Bridges completed in 1986
Ming dynasty architecture
Buildings and structures completed in 1986
1986 establishments in China